Sunman is a town in Adams Township, Ripley County, in the U.S. state of Indiana. The population was 1,049 at the 2010 census.

History
A post office has been in operation at Sunman since 1833. John Sunman, an early postmaster, gave the place his name. Sunman had its start as a town in 1856 when the railroad was extended to that point.

Geography
Sunman is located at  (39.236324, -85.093768).

Climate
The climate in this area is characterized by hot, humid summers and generally mild to cool winters.  According to the Köppen Climate Classification system, Sunman has a humid subtropical climate, abbreviated "Cfa" on climate maps.

Demographics

2010 census
As of the census of 2010, there were 1,049 people, 371 households, and 272 families living in the town. The racial makeup of the town was 95.1% White, 0.6% African American, 0.2% Asian, 2.7% from other races, and 1.4% from two or more races. Hispanic or Latino of any race were 7.9% of the population.

There were 371 households, of which 42.6% had children under the age of 18 living with them, 53.6% were married couples living together, 12.7% had a female householder with no husband present, 7.0% had a male householder with no wife present, and 26.7% were non-families. 22.6% of all households were made up of individuals, and 11.3% had someone living alone who was 65 years of age or older. The average household size was 2.83 and the average family size was 3.27.

The median age in the town was 32 years. 30% of residents were under the age of 18; 10.8% were between the ages of 18 and 24; 26.7% were from 25 to 44; 20.5% were from 45 to 64; and 11.9% were 65 years of age or older. The gender makeup of the town was 51.2% male and 48.8% female.

2000 census
As of the census of 2000, there were 805 people, 319 households, and 210 families living in the town. The racial makeup of the town was 93.79% White, 0.37% Native American, 5.59% from other races, and 0.25% from two or more races. Hispanic or Latino of any race were 5.96% of the population.

There were 319 households, out of which 35.4% had children under the age of 18 living with them, 47.3% were married couples living together, 11.9% had a female householder with no husband present, and 33.9% were non-families. 28.5% of all households were made up of individuals, and 15.0% had someone living alone who was 65 years of age or older. The average household size was 2.52 and the average family size was 3.05.

In the town, the population was spread out, with 29.1% under the age of 18, 10.6% from 18 to 24, 30.8% from 25 to 44, 15.5% from 45 to 64, and 14.0% who were 65 years of age or older. The median age was 31 years. For every 100 females, there were 93.5 males. For every 100 females age 18 and over, there were 94.2 males.

The median income for a household in the town was $33,819, and the median income for a family was $44,167. Males had a median income of $30,179 versus $24,107 for females. The per capita income for the town was $14,828. About 6.6% of families and 9.6% of the population were below the poverty line, including 9.3% of those under age 18 and 16.7% of those age 65 or over.

References

External links
 Sunman Chamber of Commerce

Towns in Ripley County, Indiana
Towns in Indiana